The United States Air Force's 26th Cyberspace Operations Group is a network operations unit located at Lackland Air Force Base, Texas. The group was commanded by Colonel Sean Kern in June 2018.

In 2016 an Air Force cyberspace network defense system attained full operational capability.

Lineage 
 Activated as the 6914th Electronic Security Squadron on 1 October 1986
 Redesignated as 26th Technical Group on 1 March 1993
 Redesignated as 26th Intelligence Group on 1 October 1993
 Redesignated as 26th Information Operations Group on 1 August 2000
 Redesignated as 26th Network Operations Group on 5 July 2006
 Redesignated as 26th Cyberspace Operations Group 1 October 2013

Assignments
 6910th Electronic Security Wing, 1 October 1986
 691st Electronic Security Wing, 15 July 1988
 26th Intelligence Wing, 1 October 1991
 67th Intelligence Wing (later 67th Information Operations Wing, 67th Network Warfare Wing, 67th Cyberspace Wing), 1 October 1993 – present
 688th Cyberspace Wing, 4 Jun 2018-.

Components
 26th Operations Support Flight (later 26th Operations Support Squadron, 1 November 2008 – present
 26th Network Operations Squadron
 Maxwell Air Force Base-Gunter Annex, Alabama, 18 August 2009
 33d Network Warfare Squadron, 26 July 2007 – present

Stations
 Sembach Air Base, Germany, 1 October 1986
 Vogelweh, Germany, 1 September 1992
 Ramstein Air Base, Germany, 1 January 1995
 Lackland Air Force Base (later, Joint Base San Antonio-Lackland) Texas, 5 July 2006 – present

Decorations
 Air Force Outstanding Unit Award with Combat "V" Device
1 June 2002 – 31 May 2003
1 October 2010 - 30 September 2012
 Air Force Outstanding Unit Award
1 July 1988 – 30 June 1990
1 Oct 1993 – 30 Sep 1994
1 Oct 1996 – 30 Sep 1997
1 Oct 1999 – 30 Sep 2000
1 June 2001 – 31 May 2002
1 June 2003 – 31 May 2005
1 Jun 2005-31 May 2007; 
1 Oct 2012-30 Sep 2013; 
1 Oct 2013-30 Sep 2015.

See also
 List of cyber warfare forces

Notes

References 
 
 

Cyberspace Operations 0026
Cyberspace 0026
Military units and formations in Texas
Military units and formations established in 2013